James “Martin” Vinnicombe (born 5 December 1964) is a former professional  Australian track cyclist who competed at the 1988 Summer Olympics in Seoul, winning a silver medal in  time trial. He tested positive for steroids in 1991, but accusations were overturned and Vinnicombe received $240,000 in compensation for false allegations in defamation. His former manager, Phill Bates, told the Sydney Morning Herald in 1996: "If you’re not cheating, you’re not trying." At 22 years of age, Vinnicombe won the world championship in  time trial in 1987, being the first ever Australian to become world champion, He also won the silver medal three times (1986, 1989 and 1990) and the bronze medal once (1985). Vinnicombe has placed 9 times at the world championships in 1,000m time trial event.

As part of the lead up to the 2008 Summer Olympics in Beijing, Vinnicombe had been selected to be in  charge of coaching Chinese cyclists in the Fujian province, but in 2005 was banned from the country for four years and fined after one of his cyclists tested positive for steroids but was overturned and received compensation for false charges, Vinnicombe denied any wrongdoing.

In 2012 he was offered to be in the cycling hall of fame.

References

External links
 
 
 

1964 births
Living people
Australian male cyclists
Cyclists at the 1988 Summer Olympics
Olympic cyclists of Australia
Olympic silver medalists for Australia
Cyclists from Melbourne
UCI Track Cycling World Champions (men)
Olympic medalists in cycling
Doping cases in Australian cycling
Medalists at the 1988 Summer Olympics
Commonwealth Games gold medallists for Australia
Commonwealth Games medallists in cycling
Australian track cyclists
Cyclists at the 1986 Commonwealth Games
Cyclists at the 1990 Commonwealth Games
Medallists at the 1986 Commonwealth Games
Medallists at the 1990 Commonwealth Games